Jussara, Bahia é um Município do Estado da Bahia na Região Nordeste do Brasil.

See also
List of municipalities in Bahia

References

Municipalities in Bahia